Family studies may refer to:
 Family study, the detection of familial aggregation in genetic epidemiology
 Home economics, the study of domestic science
 Sociology of the family, the study of family structure as a social institution